Devamı Var (To Be Continued) is the seventh studio album by the Turkish singer Mustafa Sandal. The original release date for this album was December 2006 but was later pushed to 23 April, 19 May, and 8 June 2007. Two weeks before the release, an instrumental version of the song "Çoban" ("Shepherd") was available on Mustafa Sandal's official website. The official release date for the album was 13 June 2007. The album also features two brilliant musicians, Turkish pop singer İzel, in the song "Dayan" ("Survive"), and guitarist Ayberay, on ("Zaten"). "Melek Yüzlüm" ("My angel face") has been confirmed to be the song in which Emina Jahovic was in tears. The song "Kim Bilir Kim Var Yanında?" ("Who is going to know beside?") was originally released in an early album of Turkish pop singer Ayten Alpman. The song "Farketmez" ("It doesn't matter") is a Turkish version of the 2005 World Music Award winning hit "Bastanak" by Lebanese pop singer Elissa. "Herkes Mecbur" ("Necessary to everyone") is a Turkish version of the song "Fatet Sineen" by Elissa. Devamı Var was released onto the iTunes Store on 11 July 2007. By the end of 2007 more than 2.000.000 copies was sold just in Turkey.

Track listing

Notes
Track 2, "Farketmez" is a Turkish version of the 2006 Elissa song "Bastanak" from the album "Bastanak".
Track 6, "Gönlünü Gün Edeni" is a Turkish version of the 2005 Amer Mounib song "Khadny Hawak" from the album "Kol Thanya Maak".
Track 9, "Herkes Mecbur" is a Turkish version of the 2006 Elissa song "Fatet Sineen" from the album "Bastanak".

Personnel

 Fatih Ahıskalı – oud (track 6)
 Yasemin Akat – styling
 Sinan Akçıl – arranger (track 5, 12), programming and solo piano (track 5), keyboards, classic guitar and backing vocals (track 12)
 M. Annas Allaf – acoustic guitar (track 2, 4, 8, 10), classical guitar (track 2), electric guitar (track 2, 7, 8, 10), bass guitar (track 4, 7, 8, 10)
 Erhan Bayrak – arranger (track 1, 2, 4, 7–10), keyboards (track 1, 2, 4, 7, 9), piano (track 10)
 Fettah Can – backing vocals (track 2), solo vocal (track 3)
 Ufuk Çakır – backing vocals (track 1, 4, 6, 7, 10)
 Mehmet Çelik – trumpet (track 2)
 Cengiz Ercümer – percussion (track 2, 6, 8–10, 12), backing vocals (track 12)
 Burcu Güneş – solo vocal (track 3)
 Hakan Güngör – kanun (track 6)
 Sibel Gürsoy – backing vocals (track 1, 2, 4, 6, 7, 10)
 Eyüp Hamiş – kaval (track 1)
 Yavuz İmre – technical support
 Koray Kasap – photography, styling, cover design
 Tolga Kılıç – arranger (track 6)
 Serkan Kula – mixing (track 1, 2, 4, 7, 8)
 Cihan Okan – backing vocals (track 1, 2, 4, 6, 7, 10)
 Eda Pala – backing vocals (track 1, 2, 4, 6, 7, 10) 
 İskender Paydaş – arranger (track 3)
 Bahadır Sağbaş – violins recording
 Mustafa Sandal – vocals and producer (all tracks), arranger (track 10–12)
 Ferdan Sayılı – cover design
 Bülent Seyhan – executive producer 
 İsmail Soyberk – bass guitar (track 9)
 Erdem Sökmen – classic guitar (track 1), acoustic guitar (track 9), classic guitar (track 9, 11)
 Birkan Şener – bass guitar (track 12)
 Ercan Tekin – ney (track 3)
 Bülent Tezcan – production coordinator
 Kemik Üçlüsü – wind instruments (track 7)
 Başar Yakupoğlu – mixing (track 11)
 Semih Yalman – classic guitar and backing vocals (track 12)
 Serhan Yasdıman – acoustic guitar (track 6)
 Anıl Yaylım – recording (all tracks), mixing (track 5)
 Gündem Yaylı Grubu – violins (track 1–4, 6, 7, 9, 11)
 Özgür Yedievli – arranger (track 11), intermediate melody (track 3)
 Özer Yener – mixing (track 9)
 Ahmet Yıldırım – makeup
 Ali Yılmaz – cura (track 3), oud (track 9)
 Özgür Yurtoğlu – recording (all tracks), mixing (track 3, 6, 10, 12), acoustic guitar and backing vocals (track 12)

Music videos
İndir
Melek Yüzlüm
Gönlünü Gün Edeni
Dayan

External links
Devamı Var Official Website
Devamı Var at Power Club

Mustafa Sandal albums
2007 albums